Rosan Bosch (born 1969) is the founder and creative director of Rosan Bosch Studio in Copenhagen, Denmark. Internationally known for the design of the Swedish Vittra school at Telefonplan, Bosch has designed learning environments for Sheikh Zayed Private Academy in Abu Dhabi, the IB school Western Academy of Beijing in China and Liceo Europa in Spain.

Biography 
Rosan Bosch studied at Hogeschool voor de Kunsten, Utrecht, Holland from 1987-1992 with courses from the Facultat de Belles Art at Universitat de Barcelona, Spain. For nearly a decade she worked as a contemporary artist before founding the design studio Bosch & Fjord in 2001 and her current design practice Rosan Bosch Studio in 2010, based in Copenhagen.

Design of learning environments 
Rosan Bosch’s work is characterized by an untraditional approach to the design of schools. Based on six principles, the learning spaces support different ways of learning, working and communicating in an open and shared school space. The sculptural design installations help to direct the interaction and concentration of the students for teamwork, presentations, individual work, creative hands-on tasks or informal learning in the student community.

The approach is giving priority to the students’ learning needs when planning the physical spaces of schools. By mixing art, design thinking, architecture and play, the learning environments stimulate innovative thinking and student-centered learning, supporting the pedagogical efforts and the development of 21st Century Skills.

The design of the Swedish Vittra schools is internationally known as an alternative to conventional school spaces. Instead of classrooms, large toy-like furnishings act as spatial divisions that support flexibility in learning and creative student activities.

Public speaker and advisor 
Promoting educational change through the designs of schools, Bosch is a public speaker and visiting lecturer at educational forums such as UNESCO forum on education in Mexico, Harvard Graduate School of Education, TEDxIndianapolis and Aprendemos Juntos by El Pais. As advisor to the Ministry of Education in Argentina, her studio has developed guidelines for redesigns of the 22,000 secondary schools as part of a national school reform

Other design work 
Bosch has also created design solutions for libraries, hospitals, workspaces and exhibitions. Among clients are LEGO PMD, the children hospital BørneRiget at Rigshospitalet, VELUX and The Childrens Library in Billund.

Selected projects 

 BS KA school Zottegem, Belgium (to be completed)
St. Andrew's Scots School, Argentina (2019)
Western Academy of Beijing, China (2019)
 Buddinge School, Denmark (2019)
 Glasir – Tórshavn College, Tórshavn, Faroe Islands (2018) 
 VELUX Collection, Østbirk, Denmark (2018)
 Liceo Europa, Zaragoza, Spain (2016)
 The Children’s library in Billund, Billund, Denmark (2016)
 Cultural Island, Middelfart, Denmark (2016)
 VILLUM Window Collection, Søborg, Denmark (2015)
 Sheikh Zayed Private Academy, Abu Dhabi (2015)
 Vittra Södermalm School, Stockholm, Sverige (2012)
 Bornholms Efterskole, Rønne, Denmark (2013)
 Vittra Telefonplan School, Stockholm, Sverige (2011)
 LEGO PMD, Billund, Denmark (2010)

References 

1969 births
Living people
Danish designers
Utrecht School of the Arts alumni
Danish expatriates in the Netherlands